Anthony Eden Rand (September 1, 1939 – May 1, 2020) was an American attorney and politician who served as a member of the North Carolina General Assembly from 1981 to 1989 and again from 1995 to 2009.

Early life
Rand was born in southern Wake County, North Carolina, and graduated from Garner High School in 1957. He earned a bachelor's degree in political science from the University of North Carolina at Chapel Hill in 1961 and a law degree from the University of North Carolina School of Law 1964.

Career
After serving for seven years, Rand left the Assembly to launch an unsuccessful bid for Lieutenant Governor of North Carolina in 1988, losing to Jim Gardner. Rand returned to the state Senate in 1995, where he served until his resignation in 2009. His district included Bladen and Cumberland counties. A lawyer and consultant from Fayetteville, North Carolina, Rand served as Senate Majority Leader from 2001 through 2009. He was succeeded in the leadership post by Martin Nesbitt.

In 2007, Rand proposed in Senate Bill S1557 that the state formally apologize for slavery and the denial of civil rights that followed after slavery.

On May 28, 2008, Rand filed North Carolina Senate Bill 2079 requiring North Carolina college students to mentor public school-age children in order to receive a bachelor's degree. The bill was named for Eve Carson and Abhijit Mahato, two students murdered in North Carolina in 2008.

After leaving the Senate, Rand was appointed to head the state Post-Release Supervision and Parole Commission. He was also chairman of the board of Law Enforcement Associates Corp. Later, he was chairman of the North Carolina Education Lottery Commission.

Personal life 
Rand had two children, including attorney Ripley Rand, who served as United States Attorney for the Middle District of North Carolina. Rand died of cancer on May 1, 2020 in Blowing Rock, North Carolina. He was 80.

References

External links

|-

|-

|-

North Carolina General Assembly - Senator Tony Rand official NC Senate website.
Project Vote Smart - Senator Tony Rand (NC) profile
Follow the Money - Tony Rand
2008 2006 2004 2002 2000 campaign contributions
News & Observer "Under the Dome" Profile

1939 births
2020 deaths
North Carolina lawyers
Democratic Party North Carolina state senators
People from Wake County, North Carolina
University of North Carolina at Chapel Hill alumni
University of North Carolina School of Law alumni
21st-century American politicians
20th-century American politicians
Deaths from cancer in North Carolina